Viktor Gorlov (1 February 1918 – 3 December 1982) was a Soviet sailor. He competed in the 5.5 Metre event at the 1960 Summer Olympics.

References

External links
 

1918 births
1982 deaths
Soviet male sailors (sport)
Olympic sailors of the Soviet Union
Sailors at the 1960 Summer Olympics – 5.5 Metre
Sportspeople from Saint Petersburg